3008 may refer to:

Astronomy
 3008 Nojiri, a minor planet
 NGC 3008, a lenticular galaxy

Vehicles
 German submarine U-3008, a Type XXI U-boat of Nazi Germany's Kriegsmarine that then served in the United States Navy after World War II
 HMAS LST 3008, a World War II landing ship tank that served in the Royal Navy and Royal Australian Navy
 Peugeot 3008, a 2008–present French compact SUV
 Peugeot 3008 DKR, a 2017 French rally raid car

Other uses
 3008 Docklands Magazine, an Australian magazine
 Louisiana State Highway 3008, a highway in Webster Parish, Louisiana, United States
 MP 3008, a World War II German substitute standard submachine gun
 SCP-3008, a fictional infinite IKEA retail space